Ardent spirits (ethyl alcohol), in alchemy, are those liquors obtained after repeated distillations from fermented vegetables. They are thus called because they will take fire and burn. Examples include brandy, spirits of wine, etc.

References
 

Alchemical substances